The 2012 Andalusian regional election was held on Sunday, 25 March 2012, to elect the 9th Parliament of the autonomous community of Andalusia. All 109 seats in the Parliament were up for election. The election was held simultaneously with a regional election in Asturias.

Being a Spanish Socialist Workers' Party (PSOE–A) stronghold for decades, the People's Party (PP) had scored a decisive win in the region in the November 2011 general election and was widely expected to come out on top in the regional election for the first time in its history, with opinion polls suggesting it could win an absolute majority on its own. The election, however, came to be seen as the first major electoral test for the national government of Mariano Rajoy since coming to power in December 2011, with Rajoy's policies of raising taxes and the passing of a new, harsher labour reform having triggered a general strike for 29 March. Incumbent President José Antonio Griñán chose not to hold the election simultaneously with the 2011 general election, the first time since 1994 that both elections were not held at the same time.

Final results showed a surprising close race between the PP and the PSOE–A, the first emerging out on top but falling five seats short of an overall majority. In contrast, the PSOE–A held its own and retained 47 seats despite polls predicting a tougher defeat, allowing Griñán to remain in power through a coalition government with United Left (IULV–CA), which doubled its seat count from 6 to 12 and was placed in a "kingmaker" position.

Overview

Electoral system
The Parliament of Andalusia was the devolved, unicameral legislature of the autonomous community of Andalusia, having legislative power in regional matters as defined by the Spanish Constitution of 1978 and the regional Statute of Autonomy, as well as the ability to vote confidence in or withdraw it from a regional president.

Voting for the Parliament was on the basis of universal suffrage, which comprised all nationals over 18 years of age, registered in Andalusia and in full enjoyment of their political rights. Amendments to the electoral law in 2011 required for Andalusians abroad to apply for voting before being permitted to vote, a system known as "begged" or expat vote. The 109 members of the Parliament of Andalusia were elected using the D'Hondt method and a closed list proportional representation, with an electoral threshold of three percent of valid votes—which included blank ballots—being applied in each constituency. Seats were allocated to constituencies, corresponding to the provinces of Almería, Cádiz, Córdoba, Granada, Huelva, Jaén, Málaga and Seville, with each being allocated an initial minimum of eight seats and the remaining 45 being distributed in proportion to their populations (provided that the number of seats in each province did not exceed two times that of any other).

The use of the D'Hondt method might result in a higher effective threshold, depending on the district magnitude.

Election date
The term of the Parliament of Andalusia expired four years after the date of its previous election, unless it was dissolved earlier. The election decree was required to be issued no later than the twenty-fifth day prior to the date of expiry of parliament and published on the following day in the Official Gazette of the Regional Government of Andalusia (BOJA), with election day taking place on the fifty-fourth day from publication barring any date within from 1 July to 31 August. The previous election was held on 9 March 2008, which meant that the legislature's term would have expired on 9 March 2012. The election decree was required to be published in the BOJA no later than 14 February 2012, with the election taking place on the fifty-fourth day from publication, setting the latest possible election date for the Parliament on Sunday, 8 April 2012.

The president had the prerogative to dissolve the Parliament of Andalusia and call a snap election, provided that no motion of no confidence was in process and that dissolution did not occur before one year had elapsed since the previous one. In the event of an investiture process failing to elect a regional president within a two-month period from the first ballot, the Parliament was to be automatically dissolved and a fresh election called.

Several dates were considered for the election. Initially scheduled for either 4 or 18 March, the result of the general election in 20 November 2011 made it advisable for Griñán to push the date further away to the last Sunday of March, in order to push the legislature to the limit and distance himself from the November election result. This marked the first time since 1994 that an Andalusian regional election was not held concurrently with a Spanish general election, as then-Prime Minister José Luis Rodríguez Zapatero had announced a general election—initially scheduled for March 2012—four months ahead of schedule, on 20 November 2011, whereas Griñán chose not to follow suit and to maintain the date of the regional election for early 2012.

Background
The 2008 election had seen Manuel Chaves secure a sixth term in office as president of the Regional Government of Andalusia, having governed the autonomous community uninterruptedly during the previous 18 years. However, Chaves's long tenure had already started taking a toll on his popularity in opinion polls, and in April 2009 he vacated the regional presidency in order to become third deputy prime minister in the second government of José Luis Rodríguez Zapatero. José Antonio Griñán, second vice president of the Andalusian government since 2008 and regional minister for Economy and Finance since 2004, succeeded Chaves at the helm of the regional government.

During Griñán's term, his party had to deal with the worsening economic situation resulting from the financial crisis affecting Spain since 2008, with rising unemployment reaching record heights and traditional savings banks being dismantled for being economically unsustainable. The PSOE–A also had to cope with the political fallout resulting from the ERE scandal, a corruption scheme involving the ruling party, as well as the Workers' Commissions (CCOO) and General Union of Workers (UGT) trade unions, which saw irregular payments to politicians, civil servants and companies aligned to the PSOE in exchange for loyalties and favours meant to sustain the party in power. Those payments were charged to an economic fund intended to support companies with problems—more specifically, those that were forced to undergo "Employment Regulation Procedures" (in Spanish, Expedientes de Regulación de Empleo or ERE, terminology that gave the scandal its name)—. The scandal first came under investigation in January 2011, and by the time of the 2012 regional election judicial inquiries reached out to government officers and renown figures.

The opposition People's Party (PP) of Mariano Rajoy won a resounding victory in the 2011 general election in Andalusia, winning in both seats and popular vote for the first time ever in this autonomous community since the Spanish transition to democracy: the PP obtained 1,985,612 votes (45.57%) and 33 seats to Spanish Socialist Workers' Party (PSOE–A)'s 1,594,893 votes (36.60%) and 25 seats, after losing 800,000 votes and 11 seats from those won in the 2008 general election. United Left (IULV–CA) won 2 seats from Seville and Málaga and 8.27% of the share with 360,212 votes. Results projections based on the results of the general election gave the PP an absolute majority with 58 seats—out of 109 up for election—, with the PSOE in a distant second place with 43 seats. IULV–CA would keep its 6 seats  on the projections while Union, Progress and Democracy (UPyD) could enter the Parliament of Andalusia with 2 seats. Had those results been confirmed, it would have meant the end of a 30 year-long hegemony of Socialist rule in the community, the party having been in power since the creation of the Andalusian autonomous community.

The regularly scheduled 2012 election in Andalusia, which was unexpectedly joined by a snap election in Asturias, came to be seen as the first major electoral test for the national government of Mariano Rajoy since coming to power in December 2011. Rajoy's policies of raising taxes and the passing of a new, harsher labour reform had triggered a general strike scheduled for 29 March.

Parliamentary composition
The Parliament of Andalusia was officially dissolved on 31 January 2012, after the publication of the dissolution decree in the Official Gazette of the Regional Government of Andalusia. The table below shows the composition of the parliamentary groups in the chamber at the time of dissolution.

Parties and candidates
The electoral law allowed for parties and federations registered in the interior ministry, coalitions and groupings of electors to present lists of candidates. Parties and federations intending to form a coalition ahead of an election were required to inform the relevant Electoral Commission within ten days of the election call, whereas groupings of electors needed to secure the signature of at least one percent of the electorate in the constituencies for which they sought election, disallowing electors from signing for more than one list of candidates.

Below is a list of the main parties and electoral alliances which contested the election:

Campaign

Party slogans

Election debates

Opinion polls
The tables below list opinion polling results in reverse chronological order, showing the most recent first and using the dates when the survey fieldwork was done, as opposed to the date of publication. Where the fieldwork dates are unknown, the date of publication is given instead. The highest percentage figure in each polling survey is displayed with its background shaded in the leading party's colour. If a tie ensues, this is applied to the figures with the highest percentages. The "Lead" column on the right shows the percentage-point difference between the parties with the highest percentages in a poll.

Graphical summary

Voting intention estimates
The table below lists weighted voting intention estimates. Refusals are generally excluded from the party vote percentages, while question wording and the treatment of "don't know" responses and those not intending to vote may vary between polling organisations. When available, seat projections determined by the polling organisations are displayed below (or in place of) the percentages in a smaller font; 55 seats were required for an absolute majority in the Parliament of Andalusia.

Voting preferences
The table below lists raw, unweighted voting preferences.

Victory preferences
The table below lists opinion polling on the victory preferences for each party in the event of a regional election taking place.

Victory likelihood
The table below lists opinion polling on the perceived likelihood of victory for each party in the event of a regional election taking place.

Preferred President
The table below lists opinion polling on leader preferences to become president of the Regional Government of Andalusia.

Predicted President
The table below lists opinion polling on the perceived likelihood for each leader to become president.

Voter turnout
The table below shows registered vote turnout on election day without including voters from the Census of Absent-Residents (CERA).

Results

Overall

Distribution by constituency

Aftermath

Government formation

On 3 May 2012, as a result of the PSOE–IU coalition agreement, José Antonio Griñán was re-elected as regional President. One IU deputy, Juan Manuel Sánchez Gordillo, cast an invalid vote in protest for not being able to elect a candidate of his own party.

2013 investiture

In July 2013, President Griñán announced he was resigning from his office. As regional minister Susana Díaz was the only person able to gather the required endorsements to run in the primary election that was held to elect Griñán's successor, she was unanimously proclaimed as the party's candidate for the Presidency of the Regional Government of Andalusia. As a result, on 5 September 2013 the Parliament of Andalusia elected Díaz as new regional premier.

Notes

References
Opinion poll sources

Other

2012 in Andalusia
Andalusia
Regional elections in Andalusia
March 2012 events in Europe